Serebrianka or Sriblianka is a village in Bakhmut Raion (district) in Donetsk Oblast of eastern Ukraine, at about 129 km NNE from the centre of Donetsk city, on the right bank of the Siverskyi Donets river, that separates the village from Luhansk Oblast. The village was founded in 1753 by Serbs in Slavenoserbia.

In May 2022, during the Russian invasion of Ukraine, attempts of Russian forces to cross the river near the village were repelled by Ukrainian military.

References

External links

Villages in Bakhmut Raion